James Spencer "Jim" Courier (born August 17, 1970) is an American former world No. 1 tennis player. He won four major singles titles, two at the French Open and two at the Australian Open. He was the youngest man to reach the singles finals of all four majors, at the age of 22 years and 11 months. He also won five Masters titles. Since 2005 he has worked as a tennis commentator, notably for the host broadcaster of the Australian Open, Nine (for which he also commentates and co-hosts Australian Ninja Warrior), and as an analyst for Tennis Channel and Prime Video Sport.

Tennis career
Courier was raised in Dade City, Florida, and though he excelled at youth sports in general, after a certain point it became clear that tennis was where his true talent lay. As a junior player in the 1980s, Courier attended the Nick Bollettieri Tennis Academy and won the prestigious Orange Bowl in 1986 and 1987 (the first to win back-to-back titles since Ivan Lendl), as well as the French Open junior doubles title in 1987.

Courier turned professional in 1988 and made his Grand Slam breakthrough at the 1991 French Open when he defeated Stefan Edberg and Michael Stich to reach his first Grand Slam final. In the final he defeated his former Bollettieri Academy roommate Andre Agassi in five sets to win his first Slam. He made the quarterfinals of Wimbledon before losing to eventual champion Stich. At the US Open he defeated defending champion Pete Sampras in the quarterfinals and then Jimmy Connors in the semifinals, before losing the final to Edberg.

1992 saw Courier defeat Edberg to win the Australian Open, and he celebrated by jumping into the nearby Yarra River. He then followed this result by defeating future Grand Slam champions Thomas Muster, Goran Ivanišević, Agassi and Petr Korda to successfully defend his French Open title. Afterward, Courier charmed the Parisian crowd by delivering a victory speech in French. Courier also enjoyed a 25-match winning streak during the season. In February of that year, following the San Francisco tournament, he became the tenth player to reach the world no. 1 ranking since the ranking system was implemented in 1973, and the first American since John McEnroe; he finished 1992 as the world no. 1 ranked player. Courier also was a member of the US team that won the 1992 Davis Cup. In 1992 he was the top-seeded player at the Olympics in Barcelona, where he lost in the third round to eventual gold medalist Marc Rosset from Switzerland.

In 1993, Courier again won the Australian Open, defeating Edberg in the final for the second consecutive year, and jumped into the Yarra a second time, but it was to be his last such celebration after contracting a stomach bug from the muddy and polluted river. He reached his third consecutive French Open final, which he lost to Sergi Bruguera in five sets. He also reached the 1993 Wimbledon final, defeating Edberg in the semifinals, and lost to Sampras in four sets. By reaching the Wimbledon final, Courier had reached the finals of all four Grand Slams at the age of 22, a record which still stands in men's singles. Courier also became the first player since Rod Laver to reach the finals of the Australian, French and Wimbledon in the same season; the feat was not matched until 2006 by Roger Federer. Courier again was part of the US team that won the 1995 Davis Cup.

Courier captured a total of 23 singles titles and 6 doubles titles during his career. He spent a total of 58 weeks ranked as the World No. 1 in 1992 and 1993. He reached the finals of all four major championships during his career, a feat accomplished by only seven other male players in the Open Era. Courier retired from the ATP tour in 2000. He was inducted into the International Tennis Hall of Fame in 2005.

Courier returned to the tour at the 2005 U.S. Men's Clay Court Championships when he received a wildcard into the doubles draw partnering Andre Agassi. The pair lost in the first round to eventual finalists Martín García and Luis Horna in three sets. It would be the last match of Courier's career.

After retirement from top-level tennis
Since his retirement as a top-level player, Courier has served as a tennis analyst and commentator for the Tennis Channel, USA Network, NBC Sports, TNT, ITV, Sky Sports and the Seven and Nine Networks. Since 2005, Courier has headed the commentary for the domestic host broadcaster of the Australian Open, which was Seven from 2005 to 2018 and Nine since 2019. Courier calls many centre court men's singles matches for the network and often conducts the post-match on-court interviews with the winning player. He also provided special comments on the Seven Network's Wimbledon coverage between 2013 and 2019. Courier started working with the British channel ITV for the French Open in 2012. In 2015, Courier worked with the British channel Sky Sports for their US Open coverage. The Jim Courier Club House now stands on the grounds of the Dade City Little League complex in John S. Burks Memorial Park in Dade City, Florida. Courier is an alumnus of that Little League program.

In 2004, Courier founded InsideOut Sport & Entertainment, a New York-based event production company that owns and operates the Champions Series, Legendary Nights exhibitions as well as private corporate events.

He also founded Courier's Kids, a non-profit organization that supports tennis programs in the inner city of St. Petersburg, Florida.

Courier currently competes on the Champions Series and in various charity exhibition matches.

Courier married Susanna Lingman in 2010.

On October 27, 2010, Courier was named captain of the United States Davis Cup team, replacing Patrick McEnroe. Courier stepped down from the role after the 2018 semi-final defeat to Croatia. Courier led his country with a 10–8 record and two semi-final appearances during his captaincy.

In August 2019, Courier was working for Prime Video UK, for their exclusive coverage of the US Open.

Career statistics

Grand Slam finals

Singles finals: 7 (4 titles, 3 runner-ups)

Year-end championship

Singles finals: 2 (2 runner-ups)

ATP Super 9 / ATP Masters Series finals

Singles finals: 5 (5 titles)

Doubles finals: 5 (4 titles, 1 runner up)

Records
These records were attained in Open Era of tennis.

ATP career finals

Singles: 36 (23 titles, 13 runner-ups)

Doubles: 11 (6–5)

Singles performance timeline

1 Held as Stockholm Masters until 1994, Stuttgart Masters from 1995 to 2001.

Professional Awards
ITF World Champion: 1992.
ATP Player of the Year: 1992.

Head-to-head
Courier has the following head-to-head records against the listed opponents (No. 1 ranked players in boldface):

Michael Chang (12–12)
Wayne Ferreira (9–2)
Goran Ivanišević (8–3)
Guy Forget (7–1)
Richard Krajicek (7–1)
Marc Rosset (7–4)
Andre Agassi (7–5)
Thomas Muster (7–5)
Todd Martin (6–1)
Thomas Enqvist (6–2)
Stefan Edberg (6–4)
Sergi Bruguera (5–2)
Cédric Pioline (5–4)
Michael Stich (5–7)
Greg Rusedski (4–0)
Andrei Chesnokov (4–6)
Pete Sampras (4–16)
Jimmy Connors (3–0)
Tim Henman (3–1)
Petr Korda (3–1)
Karol Kučera (3–1)
Sjeng Schalken (3–1)
David Wheaton (3–3)
Carlos Costa (2–1)
Andrés Gómez (2–1)
John McEnroe (2–1)
Carlos Moyá (2–1)
Andrei Cherkasov (2–2)
Albert Costa (2–2)
Brad Gilbert (2–2)
Magnus Larsson (2–2)
Andrei Medvedev (2–2)
Jonathan Stark (2–2)
Gustavo Kuerten (1–0)
David Nalbandian (1–0)
Marat Safin (1–1)
Andrei Olhovskiy (1–1)
Slava Doseděl (1–4)
Yevgeny Kafelnikov (1–5)
Boris Becker (1–6)
Alberto Berasategui (0–2)
Patrick Rafter (0–3)
Marcelo Ríos (0–3)
Àlex Corretja (0–4)
Ivan Lendl (0–4)

Top 10 wins

Champions Series titles
2005: Stanford Cup Houston – defeated Todd Martin 6–2, 6–3
2006: Champions Cup Naples – defeated Pat Cash 6–4, 7–6(8)
2006: The Championships at the Palisades – defeated Martin 5–7, 7–6(6), [10–4]
2008: The Residences at the Ritz-Carlton Grand Cayman Legends Championship – defeated Wayne Ferreira 7–6(3), 7–6(1)

NOTE: In Champions Series tournaments, there are only two sets. A tiebreaker to ten is held instead of a third set.

References

External links

 
 
 
 

1970 births
Living people
American male tennis players
American tennis coaches
Australian Open (tennis) champions
Australian television presenters 
French Open champions
French Open junior champions
Olympic tennis players of the United States
People from Dade City, Florida
Sportspeople from New York City
Sportspeople from Sanford, Florida
Tennis commentators
International Tennis Hall of Fame inductees
Tennis people from Florida
Tennis people from New York (state) 
Tennis players at the 1992 Summer Olympics
Grand Slam (tennis) champions in men's singles
Grand Slam (tennis) champions in boys' doubles
Masters tennis players
Pasco High School (Florida) alumni
ATP number 1 ranked singles tennis players
ITF World Champions